Callionymus kanakorum is a species of dragonet endemic to the waters around New Caledonia where it is found at depths of from .  This species grows to a length of  SL.

References 

K
Fish described in 2006
Taxa named by Ronald Fricke